Boveyri (also Romanized as Boveyrī and Buvairi; also known as Boveyrī-ye Bālā and Boveyrī-ye ‘Olyā) is a village in Shabankareh Rural District, Shabankareh District, Dashtestan County, Bushehr Province, Iran. At the 2006 census, its population was 1,515, in 328 families.

References 

Populated places in Dashtestan County